The knockout stage of the 2017 Africa Cup of Nations took place from 28 January to the final on 5 February 2017 in Gabon.

In the knockout stages, if a match was level at the end of normal playing time, extra time was played (two periods of 15 minutes each) and followed, if necessary, by a penalty shoot-out to determine the winner, except for the third place play-off, where no extra time was played and the match went directly to penalties if level.

All times are local, WAT (UTC+1).

Qualified teams
The top two placed teams from each of the four groups advanced to the knockout stage.

Bracket

Quarter-finals

Burkina Faso vs Tunisia

Senegal vs Cameroon

DR Congo vs Ghana

Egypt vs Morocco

Semi-finals

Burkina Faso vs Egypt

Cameroon vs Ghana

Third place play-off

Final

References

External links
2017 Africa Cup of Nations, CAFonline.com

Knockout stage